Giuseppe Lorenzo (born 27 December 1964) is an Italian retired professional footballer who played as a forward. He currently holds the record for the fastest-ever sending off in a professional match; the non-professional record is held by English footballer David Pratt. Lorenzo was sent off after just 10 seconds on 9 December 1990 while playing for Bologna against Parma for striking an opponent. Lorenzo also played for Catanzaro, Sampdoria and Cesena in a career which lasted from 1982 to 1996. In 2007, The Times placed him at number 12 in their list of the 50 hardest footballers in history.

References

External links

1964 births
Living people
Italian footballers
Serie A players
Serie B players
Serie C players
U.S. Catanzaro 1929 players
U.C. Sampdoria players
A.C. Cesena players
Bologna F.C. 1909 players
Taranto F.C. 1927 players
Association football forwards
Serie A (women's football) managers